Evening Star is the name of the following newspapers:

Evening Star (Ipswich), a daily newspaper in Ipswich, England, published since 1885
Evening Star (Dunedin), a daily newspaper published in Dunedin, New Zealand, from 1863 to 1979
 The Evening Star, former name of The Star in Auburn, Indiana, United States
Washington Evening Star, a daily afternoon newspaper published in Washington, D.C., from 1852 to 1981
The Evening Star, a newspaper published in the 1800s in what is now Rensselaer, New York
The Evening Star, former name of the Toronto Star, a daily newspaper based in Toronto, Ontario, Canada
The Evening Star (Boulder, Western Australia), a daily newspaper published in Kalgoorlie-Boulder from 1898 to 1921

See also
The Evening and the Morning Star (1832–1834), the first newspaper of the Latter Day Saint movement
 Evening Star (disambiguation)
 Star (newspaper)